Giovani Lo Celso (born 9 April 1996) is an Argentine professional footballer who plays as a central midfielder for La Liga club Villarreal, on loan from Premier League club Tottenham Hotspur, and the Argentina national team.

Club career

Rosario Central
Lo Celso is a youth product of Rosario Central. He made his league debut at 19 July 2015 against Vélez Sarsfield in a 0-0 home draw. On 28 February 2016, Lo Celso scored his first Rosario Central goal in a 3–0 victory over Colón, netting Rosario's first in the 6th minute. He then went on to score his second of the campaign in a 3–2 defeat to Vélez Sarsfield on 10 April 2016.

Paris Saint-Germain
On 26 July 2016, Lo Celso joined French giants Paris Saint-Germain on a five-year deal until 2021, for a fee around the margin of £8.5m. He remained at Rosario Central on loan until 31 December 2016. He made his debut for the French side on 5 April 2017 in a Coupe de France quarter final game against US Avranches. He replaced Adrien Rabiot in the 63rd minute of a 4–0 away win.

Lo Celso came on and assisted for Dani Alves’ goal in the UEFA Champions League match against Celtic FC to make the scoreline 7–1. He scored his first goal for PSG in a 3–2 Coupe de la Ligue win against Rennes on 30 January 2018.

On 8 May 2018, he scored as PSG won 2–0 against Les Herbiers VF to clinch the 2017–18 Coupe de France.

Real Betis
On 31 August 2018, Lo Celso joined La Liga side Real Betis on a season-long loan with an option to buy. Betis triggered this option on 16 April 2019 and Lo Celso joined the club on a permanent basis. During his time at the club, Lo Celso made 46 appearances in all competitions, scoring 16 goals.

Tottenham Hotspur
On 8 August 2019, Lo Celso signed for Tottenham Hotspur on a season-long loan with an option to buy, after a long summer of speculation over his future. He made his debut for Tottenham as a late substitute in the second Premier League match of the season against Manchester City that ended 2–2, a match notable for a controversy over VAR and a new rule on handball introduced this season.

After three substitute appearances for the club, Lo Celso injured his hip while on international duty for Argentina. After returning from injury, he made his first start for Tottenham, scoring his first goal for the club that kicked off a 4–0 win over Red Star Belgrade in the UEFA Champions League, which was the first away win for Tottenham in six months. On 14 January 2020, Lo Celso scored the opening goal in a 2-1 win for Spurs against Middlesbrough in the FA Cup.

Lo Celso's contract was made permanent on 28 January 2020 with the new deal running until the summer of 2025.

In the 2020–21 season, Lo Celso scored his first goals of the season when he netted a brace in the 7–2 win against Maccabi Haifa in a Europa League play-off match. On 21 November 2020, Lo Celso scored his first Premier League goal, 35 seconds after coming on as a substitute in the match against Manchester City, which helped secure a 2–0 win.

Loan to Villarreal 
On 31 January 2022, Lo Celso joined La Liga club Villarreal on loan until the end of the 2021–22 season. On 14 August 2022, he rejoined Villarreal on loan for the 2022–23 season.

International career

Due to some impressive performances at Rosario Central, Lo Celso earned a call-up to the Argentina U23 squad for the 2016 Summer Olympics. On 4 August 2016, Lo Celso made his Argentina U23 debut in a 2–0 defeat against Portugal, replacing Cristian Espinoza in the 72nd minute.

On 11 November 2017, Lo Celso made his Argentina debut in a 1–0 victory over Russia. He started the match and was replaced by Alejandro Gómez in the 59th minute. In May 2018, he was named in Argentina’s preliminary 35 man squad for the 2018 FIFA World Cup in Russia; he was later included in the final 23-man selection for the tournament.

In May 2019, Lo Celso was included in Lionel Scaloni's final 23-man Argentina squad for the 2019 Copa América. On 28 June, in the quarter-finals of the tournament, Lo Celso scored Argentina's second goal in a 2–0 win over Venezuela, which enabled his team to advance to the semi-finals of the competition.

In June 2021, Lo Celso was once again included in Scaloni's final Argentina 28-man squad for the 2021 Copa América, which the team eventually won. He also played against Italy in the Finalissima, which Argentina won 3–0 at Wembley Stadium, England on 1 June 2022. He was not included in the FIFA World Cup 2022 squad, due to a hamstring injury.

Personal life
Born in Argentina, Lo Celso also holds an Italian passport due to his Italian heritage. His younger brother Francesco is also a professional footballer and currently plays for Rosario Central.

Career statistics

Club

International

Scores and results list Argentina's goal tally first.

Honours
Paris Saint-Germain
Ligue 1: 2017–18
Coupe de France: 2016–17, 2017–18
Coupe de la Ligue: 2017–18
Trophée des Champions: 2017, 2018

Tottenham Hotspur
EFL Cup runner-up: 2020–21

Argentina
Copa América: 2021
CONMEBOL–UEFA Cup of Champions: 2022

References

External links

Profile at the Tottenham Hotspur F.C. website
 
 
 

1996 births
Living people
Footballers from Rosario, Santa Fe
Argentine footballers
Association football midfielders
Rosario Central footballers
Paris Saint-Germain F.C. players
Real Betis players
Tottenham Hotspur F.C. players
Villarreal CF players
Argentine Primera División players
Ligue 1 players
La Liga players
Premier League players
Argentina international footballers
2018 FIFA World Cup players
2019 Copa América players
2021 Copa América players
Olympic footballers of Argentina
Footballers at the 2016 Summer Olympics
Copa América-winning players
Argentine expatriate footballers
Expatriate footballers in France
Expatriate footballers in Spain
Expatriate footballers in England
Argentine expatriate sportspeople in France
Argentine expatriate sportspeople in Spain
Argentine expatriate sportspeople in England
Argentine sportspeople of Italian descent